The Quebec Winter Carnival, commonly known in both English and French as Carnaval, is a pre-Lenten festival held in Quebec City. After being held intermittently since 1894, the Carnaval de Québec has been celebrated annually since 1955. That year, Carnaval de Bonhomme, the mascot of the festival, made his first appearance. Up to one million people attended the Carnaval de Québec in 2006 making it, at the time, the largest winter festival in the world (since overtaken by the Harbin Festival). It is, however, the largest winter festival in the Western Hemisphere.

Activities and attractions
The most famous attractions of this winter festival are the night-time and daytime parades led by mascot Bonhomme Carnaval. The parades wind through the upper city, decorated for the occasion with lights and ice sculptures.  

Numerous public and private parties, shows and balls are held across the city, some of them outside in the bitter cold, testimony to the Québécois' fabled joie de vivre.

Other major events include:
A masquerade ball with up to 400 participants at the grand ballroom of the Château Frontenac.
The opening and closing ceremonies taking place at the Ice Palace before thousands of participants, Bonhomme and the mayor of Quebec.
Outdoor sport events (snowboarding, ice canoe, snowshoes, hockey, dog-sledding, etc., some of them part of World Championship tournaments) inside and outside the city.
Free outdoor public banquets (brunch, breakfast, etc.).
The Canadian, Québécois, International and Student artist snow sculpture contests on the Plains of Abraham, the main setting of the carnival. The Plains are a public city park and stay open for leisure activities, including snowshoeing and cross-country skiing trails, during carnival time. Part of the Plains around the Citadel is transformed into an outdoor winter amusement park with various family-themed activities, including the display of the three main snow-sculpting contests (Canada's provinces, Quebec's regions, International) and the traditional bikini snow bath event (bain de neige)

Outdoor dance parties are held at the Ice Palaces.

Kiosks and other outlets in the city sell the Bonhomme effigy tag that grants admission into most of the events, although some are free outside the main site.
Most commercial main streets are decorated and some bars and restaurants set up a winter patio in front of their establishments.
Bonhomme – short for bonhomme de neige ("snowman") is the official ambassador of the festivities, the castle lord of the Ice Palace. Bonhomme is described as a seven-foot-tall, four-hundred pound snowman sporting a red cap, black buttons and a ceinture fléchée that gives acknowledgement to French-Canadian and Métis style clothing.
It is traditional to drink Caribou, a hot alcoholic beverage, to keep warm.
The public auction is a fundraising event in aid of the carnival. This auction features many goods and services donated for silent auction and live auction.

Feasts and restaurants
The Business Leaders' Luncheon, organized by the Québec City Chamber of Commerce.
The 'Restaurant Partners' Campaign is a 179-day promotion during which Québec City restaurants offer customers a special menu for a fixed price throughout the carnival (including appetizer, soup, or salad, a main course, and a dessert).

Races and tournaments
A sleigh race in which drivers and their horses take part in a single- and double-harness race on the Plains of Abraham.
An Ice canoe race on the St. Lawrence river.
The Quebec International Pee-Wee Hockey Tournament was founded in 1960 by Gérard Bolduc, Paul Dumont and others, was part of the program until 1977.
The Snowboard World Cup in Quebec City (not part of the carnival official program).

Gallery

See also
 Winter festival

References

External links 
 Quebec Winter Carnaval virtual tour in panoramic photography
 Tornoipee-wee.qc.ca
 Fissnowboard.com
 Icehotel-canada.com 

Tourist attractions in Quebec City
Festivals in Quebec City
Winter festivals in Canada
Mardi Gras
1894 establishments in Quebec